Debra Hanson is a Canadian set designer and costume designer.

Life and career
Debra graduated from Dalhousie University and the National Theatre School of Canada. She designed 32 productions at the Stratford Festival of Canada as Head of the Design line. Her opera credits include Jenufa and Cosi fan tutte.

Selected filmography

 2021 – The Handmaid's Tale
 2015-2020 – Schitt's Creek
 2017-2018 – Frankie Drake Mysteries
 2014-2017 – Orphan Black
 2015 – Remember

 2013 – Bomb Girls
 2012 – The Firm
 2011 – Combat Hospital
 2010 – Casino Jack
 2009 – Chloe

Awards and nominations

References

External links
 

Living people
Canadian costume designers
Canadian scenic designers
Canadian theatre designers
Women costume designers
Canadian women in film
Year of birth missing (living people)